Girish R Gowda (born 9 February 1986) is an Indian kickboxer and cancer survivor. Ten months after being diagnosed with blood cancer, the 32-year-old ignored his doctor's advice and was back in the boxing ring to win a gold medal at the Wako India Kickboxing Federation Championship in Delhi.

Biography 
Girish R Gowda was born on 9 February 1986 in Bangalore. His father was named Ramachandra, and his mother, Bhagyamma. He had 4 siblings and was an only son. At the age of 12 Girish's father passed away. He finished schooling in GSPK and joined ITI to pursue welding.
He started working at the age of 18 as a Delivery Boy for Horlicks.

Early life and career 
At the age of 19 while heading back home after work Gowda accidentally stepped on a political banner. Upon realizing it, he returned the banner. The owner of the banner immediately started an argument which ended with Gowda getting slapped in public. Humiliated and dejected, a stunned Girish went home and cried. He wanted to take revenge but realized that he is responsible for his family's well-being. Girish decided to channel his anger into something interesting and productive. He enrolled in boxing class without informing his mother. He sneakily attended classes either before or after work hours. His mother eventually found out and wasn't happy. She told him to either study or work and not to waste time pursuing pointless ventures. Girish understood the need of supporting his family, but did not want to give up his dreams. He promised his mother that he would stop boxing, but instead joined Karate classes as well. After five years later he was awarded a black belt in Karate, Girish recalled the feeling of vengeance against the politician had disappeared and was instead replaced by the self-discipline of a fighter. Thanks to his prowess had sheer hard work. Girish was fighting professionally. Girish started competing in the district, state, national and international levels.

Professional achievements  
 Won bronze Medal at National Kickboxing Championship, Vizag in 2011
 Won Silver Medal at National Kickboxing Championship, Vizag in 2012
 Won Gold Medal at Haryana National Level Kickboxing in 2014
 Won Gold Medal in 81 kg Category at WAKO National Kickboxing Championship, 2015
 Won Silver Medal in 81 kg Category at WAKO Asian Kickboxing Championship, 2015
 Runner up in Pro-Am national Muay Thai Championship in September 2015
 Top 16 in World Championship held in Dublin, Ireland in November 2015
 Won Gold Medal at National Level Kickboxing in January 2016
 Won Gold Medal at federation cup in February 2016
 Won Gold Medal at National Kickboxing Championship, Vizag in 2016
 Won Silver Medal at World Cup diamond in Anapa, Russia September 2016 at WAKO World kickboxing Championship
 Won Gold Medal at National Level Kickboxing in January 2017
 Won Gold Medal at National Level Kickboxing in January 2018
 Won Gold Medal at National Level Kickboxing in January 2019
 40 Medals in national level kickboxing
 Total 175 kick boxing medals

Awards and honors   
 Best Kickboxer award from Department of Youth & Sports Karnataka 2019
 Nominated as "Hero of Bangalore"
 Young Achiever in Lions Club
 Received a Award Called SULTAN OF KARNATAKA in March 2016
 Awarded Doctorate at Bangkok, Thailand in March 2019
 Best kickboxing athlete award at GTF World Summit 2019

Skills 

 Kickboxer 2nd DAN black belt
 International Wushu fighter
 Karate 2nd DAN black belt and also karate state level champion
 Recognized as kickboxing Indian national referee
 International judge and referee - Ring Sport National Coach Certificate, Lonevala in Rothak September 2017
 Speaker with Swiss coach
 Professional trekker till now 375+ trekking 
 Overcame acute promyelocytic leukemia with 113 chemotherapy even while attending tournaments
 Trained more than 5000 people such as athletes, celebrities, group classes and more.
 Professional fight trainer 
 Fitness trainer
 Certified personal trainer

References 

https://www.newskarnataka.com/bangalore/bluru-kickboxers-biggest-fight-9-month-long-battle-with-blood-cancer
https://www.kannadaprabha.com/sports/2018/jan/20/karnataka-kickboxer-knocks-out-cancer-wins-national-championship-307657.html  
https://www.thebetterindia.com/129416/girish-gowda-karnataka-kickboxer-beat-cancer/ 
http://www.newindianexpress.com/cities/bengaluru/2017/feb/15/quest-for-revenge-turns-bengaluru-delivery-boy-into-a-kickboxer-1570650.html 
https://www.pocketnewsalert.com/2016/10/Girish-R-Gowda-The-Silver-Medal-winner-in-the-World-Cup-Diamond.html?m=1

Indian male kickboxers
1986 births
Living people